List of simple groups may refer to:

List of finite simple groups
List of simple Lie groups